Joep Kluskens (born 9 November 2002) is a Dutch professional footballer who plays as a midfielder for Eerste Divisie club VVV-Venlo.

Career
Kluskens started playing football for amateur club RSKV Merefeldia, before joining the Fortuna Sittard academy in 2011. Kluskens then moved to PSV where he spent a total of five years in their youth academy. In 2019 he returned to Fortuna Sittard before moving to VVV-Venlo in 2020. On 25 April 2022 he made his league debut for VVV during a 6–1 away loss at Jong Ajax. The following week he made his first start, impressing with his positive passing in a 2–2 draw against Excelsior.

Career statistics

References

External links
 

Living people
2002 births
Dutch footballers
Eerste Divisie players
VVV-Venlo players
Association football midfielders
People from Nederweert
Footballers from Limburg (Netherlands)